"Goodbye Toulouse" is a song by The Stranglers, appearing as the second song on their 1977 debut album Rattus Norvegicus. The lyrics were written by Jean-Jacques Burnel and the music by Hugh Cornwell, although it was credited to the band as a whole.

Overview
The song tells of  Nostradamus' predictions on the French town of Toulouse, with the song acting as a 'goodbye' to the town. Cornwell refers to the song as 'very unpunk'.

Writing and composition
The music was written by Cornwell and the lyrics were later written by Burnel. Initially, Burnel wanted to sing, but because his bass line was so frenetic that Hugh agreed to sing. At the time, this was an oddity, as the pair usually sang their own individual lyrics. Burnel's lyrics were inspired by Nostradamus' predictions that there was going to be a cataclysmic event on Toulouse, and he wrote the song as a 'goodbye' to the town. The song begins with Dave Greenfield's signature organ effect, shifting up and down in tone until the drums, bass, guitar, and keyboards all eventually come in throughout the song. The song's guitar solo features heavy amounts of delay and multitracking, giving the effect of two guitar solos in unison. The explosion sound effect at the end is meant to represent an atomic meltdown of the town.

Personnel
Hugh Cornwell –  lead vocals, lead and  rhythm guitar
Jean-Jacques Burnel –  backing vocals, bass guitar
Dave Greenfield –  backing vocals, Hammond organ
Jet Black –  drums

The Stranglers songs
1977 songs
Songs written by Hugh Cornwell
Songs written by Jean-Jacques Burnel
Songs written by Jet Black
Songs written by Dave Greenfield
Song recordings produced by Martin Rushent